The 2015 Veikkausliiga was the 85th season of top-tier football in Finland. HJK Helsinki were the defending champions. The season was won by SJK, ending HJK's record streak of six straight titles.

Teams
TPS were relegated to Ykkönen after finishing at the bottom of the 2014 season. Their place was taken by Ykkönen champions HIFK.

FC Honka and MYPA were not given a license due to the clubs' bad economic situation. The two places were given for KTP, the runner-up of 2014 Ykkönen, and Ilves, which finished third in Ykkönen.

Stadia and location

Personnel and kits

Managerial changes

League table

Results

Matches 1–22

Matches 23–33

Relegation play-offs

PK-35 Vantaa won 3–2 on aggregate.

Statistics

Top scorers
Source: veikkausliiga.com

Top assists
Source: veikkausliiga.com

Awards

Annual awards

See also
 2015 Ykkönen
 2015 Kakkonen

References

External links
 Official site 
 Escape To Suomi

Veikkausliiga seasons
Fin
Fin
1